Velez may refer to:

Places
 Vélez de Benaudalla, Spain
 Vélez Sársfield (barrio), Buenos Aires, Argentina
 Vélez-Blanco, Spain
 Vélez-Málaga, Spain
 Vélez-Rubio, Spain
 Vélez, Santander, Colombia
 Velež (Bosnia and Herzegovina), a mountain
 Velez Islands (Peñón de Vélez de la Gomera)

Sports clubs
 Club Atlético Vélez Sarsfield, Argentina
 FK Velež Mostar, Bosnia and Herzegovina
 Vélez CF, Spain

Other uses
 Vélez (name), including a list of people with the name
 Velez College, Cebu City, Philippines

See also